Sgor Gaibhre (955 m) is a mountain in the Grampian Mountains of Scotland. It lies on the border of Highland and Perth and Kinross, near Loch Ossian.

A remote mountain in the heart of the Grampians, it is usually climbed from either Rannoch Moor to the west or Corrour railway station.

References

Mountains and hills of Perth and Kinross
Mountains and hills of Highland (council area)
Marilyns of Scotland
Munros